The West Hollywood City Hall is a historic building in West Hollywood, California, U.S..

Architectural significance
The building was completed in 1962. It was designed in the Modernist architectural style. It was renovated in 1995.

Rainbow flag controversy
In an effort to be more inclusive towards the heterosexual community, the city council voted to take down the rainbow flag from the building in January 2014. A month later, they agreed to hoist a new flag with a rainbow logo.

References

Buildings and structures in West Hollywood, California
Government buildings completed in 1962
City halls in California
Modernist architecture in California